A Song in the Night, released in 1996 on CGI Records, is a gospel music album by American urban contemporary gospel group Witness. This was the group's last album to feature founding member Diane Campbell and features vocals by singer Marshetta Nichols in addition to the four group members. The  album hit number three on the Billboard Gospel Albums chart.

Track listing 
"The Blood"
"A Song in the Night"
"Prelude"
"Give It to Him"
"Oh What Love"
"Never Change"
"More Than a Conqueror"
"Jesus Will Answer Your Prayer"
"That's What You Mean to Me"
"Take the Time to Wait"
"Ask of Me"

Personnel
Lisa Page Brooks: Vocals 
Laeh Page: Vocals
Diane Campbell: Vocals
Lou Ann Stewart: Vocals
Marshetta Nichols: Vocals

Charts

References

1995 albums
Witness (gospel group) albums